Mohamed Khairy (born 26 December 1981) is an Egyptian former professional snooker player. Khairy turned professional in 2012 after having been nominated by the African Billiards and Snooker Federation, but was relegated from the tour after two seasons.

Career

Debut season 
Khairy did not play in the first six ranking tournaments and all ten Players Tour Championship events due to visa problems. He lost all of his first four matches as a professional, with Khairy's season ending when he was beaten 3–10 by Tony Drago in the first round of World Championship Qualifying. He finished his first year on tour ranked world number 96.

2013/2014 season 

Khairy won his first match as a professional in the Shanghai Masters qualifiers where he beat Passakorn Suwannawat 5–4. Afterwards it was announced by World Snooker that the match was being investigated due to unusual betting patterns. Khairy then defeated Rod Lawler 5–1, before being whitewashed 5–0 by Peter Lines in the penultimate round. After failing to qualify for the International Championship he didn't enter another tournament, resulting in his relegation from the main tour as he ended the season ranked 121st in the world. No charges were ever brought regarding the betting activity.

Amateur career
In 2015, Khairy lost 6–5 to Hatem Yassen in the final of the African Championship. A win would have regained him a place on the snooker tour.

Performance and rankings timeline

References 

1981 births
Living people
Egyptian snooker players
Sportspeople from Cairo